Castle Bravo was the first in a series of high-yield thermonuclear weapon design tests conducted by the United States at Bikini Atoll, Marshall Islands, as part of Operation Castle. Detonated on March 1, 1954, the device was the most powerful nuclear device detonated by the United States and its first lithium deuteride fueled thermonuclear weapon. At the time, it was the most powerful artificial explosion in history.

Fallout, the heaviest of which was in the form of pulverized surface coral from the detonation, fell on residents of Rongelap and Utirik atolls, while the more particulate and gaseous fallout spread around the world. The inhabitants of the islands were not evacuated until three days later and suffered radiation sickness. Twenty-three crew members of the Japanese fishing vessel Daigo Fukuryū Maru ("Lucky Dragon No. 5") were also contaminated by the heavy fallout, experiencing acute radiation syndrome. The blast incited a strong international reaction over atmospheric thermonuclear testing.

Bomb design

Primary system

The primary device was a COBRA deuterium-tritium gas-boosted atomic bomb made by Los Alamos Scientific Laboratory, a very compact MK 7 device. This boosted fission device was tested in the Upshot Knothole Climax event and yielded  (out of 50–70 kt expected yield range). It was considered successful enough that the planned operation series Domino, designed to explore the same question about a suitable primary for thermonuclear bombs, could be canceled. The explosive material of the inner charges in the MK 7 was changed to the more powerful Cyclotol 75/25, instead of the Composition B used in most stockpiled bombs at that time, as Cyclotol 75/25 was denser than Composition B and thus could generate the same amount of explosive force in a smaller volume (it provided 13 percent more compressive energy than Comp B). The composite uranium-plutonium COBRA core was levitated in a type-D pit. COBRA was Los Alamos' most recent product of design work on the "new principles" of the hollow core. A copper pit liner encased within the weapon-grade plutonium inner capsule prevented DT gas diffusion into the plutonium, a technique first tested in Greenhouse Item. It was located at the end of the device, which, as seen in the declassified film, shows a small cone projecting from the ballistic case. This cone is the part of the paraboloid that was used to focus the radiation emanating from the primary into the secondary.

Deuterium and lithium
The device was called SHRIMP, and had the same basic configuration (radiation implosion) as the Ivy Mike wet device, except with a different type of fusion fuel. SHRIMP used lithium deuteride (LiD), which is solid at room temperature; Ivy Mike used cryogenic liquid deuterium (D2), which required elaborate cooling equipment. Castle Bravo was the first test by the United States of a practical deliverable fusion bomb, even though the TX-21 as proof-tested in the Bravo event was not weaponized. The successful test rendered obsolete the cryogenic design used by Ivy Mike and its weaponized derivative, the JUGHEAD, which was slated to be tested as the initial Castle Yankee. It also used a 7075 aluminium ballistic case 9.5 cm thick. Aluminium was used to drastically reduce the bomb's weight and simultaneously provided sufficient radiation confinement time to raise yield, a departure from the heavy stainless steel casing (304L or MIM 316L) employed by contemporary weapon-projects.

The SHRIMP was at least in theory and in many critical aspects identical in geometry to the RUNT and RUNT II devices later proof-fired in Castle Romeo and Castle Yankee respectively. On paper it was a scaled-down version of these devices, and its origins can be traced back to the spring and summer of 1953. The United States Air Force indicated the importance of lighter thermonuclear weapons for delivery by the B-47 Stratojet and B-58 Hustler. Los Alamos National Laboratory responded to this indication with a follow-up enriched version of the RUNT scaled down to a 3/4 scale radiation-implosion system called the SHRIMP. The proposed weight reduction (from TX-17's  to TX-21's ) would provide the Air Force with a much more versatile deliverable gravity bomb. The final version tested in Castle used partially enriched lithium as its fusion fuel. Natural lithium is a mixture of lithium-6 and lithium-7 isotopes (with 7.5% of the former). The enriched lithium used in Bravo was nominally 40% lithium-6 (the remainder was the much more common lithium-7, which was incorrectly assumed to be inert). The fuel slugs varied in enrichment from 37 to 40% in Li, and the slugs with lower enrichment were positioned at the end of the fusion-fuel chamber, away from the primary. The lower levels of lithium enrichment in the fuel slugs, compared with the ALARM CLOCK and many later hydrogen weapons, were due to shortages in enriched lithium at that time, as the first of the Alloy Development Plants (ADP) started production by the fall of 1953. The mixture cost about 4.54 USD/g at that time. The fusion burn efficiency was close to 25.1%, the highest attained efficiency of the first thermonuclear weapon generation. This efficiency is well within the figures given in a November 1956 statement, when a DOD official disclosed that thermonuclear devices with efficiencies ranging from 15% to up about 40% had been tested. Hans Bethe reportedly stated independently that the first generation of thermonuclear weapons had (fusion) efficiencies varying from as low as 15% to up about 25%.

The thermonuclear burn would produce (like the fission fuel in the primary) pulsations (generations) of high-energy neutrons with an average temperature of 14 MeV through Jetter's cycle.

Jetter's cycle

The Jetter cycle is a combination of reactions involving lithium, deuterium, and tritium. It consumes Lithium-6 and deuterium, and in two reactions (with energies of 17.6 MeV and 4.8 MeV, mediated by a neutron and tritium) it produces two alpha particles.

The reaction would produce high-energy neutrons with 14 MeV, and its neutronicity was estimated at ≈0.885 (for a Lawson criterion of ≈1.5).

Possible additional tritium for high-yield
As SHRIMP, along with the RUNT I and ALARM CLOCK, were to be high-yield shots required to assure the thermonuclear “emergency capability”, their fusion fuel may have been spiked with additional tritium, in the form of LiT. All of the high-energy 14 MeV neutrons would cause fission in the uranium fusion tamper wrapped around the secondary and the spark plug's plutonium rod. The ratio of deuterium (and tritium) atoms burned by 14 MeV neutrons spawned by the burning was expected to vary from 5:1 to 3:1, a standardization derived from Mike, while for these estimations, the ratio of 3:1 was predominantly used in ISRINEX. The neutronicity of the fusion reactions harnessed by the fusion tamper would dramatically increase the yield of the device.

SHRIMPs indirect drive

Attached to the cylindrical ballistic case was a natural-uranium liner, the radiation case, that was about 2.5 cm thick. Its internal surface was lined with a copper liner that was about 240 μm thick, and made from 0.08-μm thick copper foil, to increase the overall albedo of the hohlraum. Copper possesses excellent reflecting properties, and its low cost, compared to other reflecting materials like gold, made it useful for mass-produced hydrogen weapons. Hohlraum albedo is a very important design parameter for any inertial-confinement configuration. A relatively high albedo permits higher interstage coupling due to the more favorable azimuthal and latitudinal angles of reflected radiation. The limiting value of the albedo for high-Z materials is reached when the thickness is 5–10 g/cm, or 0.5–1.0 free paths. Thus, a hohlraum made of uranium much thicker than a free path of uranium would be needlessly heavy and costly. At the same time, the angular anisotropy increases as the atomic number of the scatterer material is reduced. Therefore, hohlraum liners require the use of copper (or, as in other devices, gold or aluminium), as the absorption probability increases with the value of Z of the scatterer. There are two sources of X-rays in the hohlraum: the primary's irradiance, which is dominant at the beginning and during the pulse rise; and the wall, which is important during the required radiation temperature's (T) plateau. The primary emits radiation in a manner similar to a flash bulb, and the secondary needs constant T to properly implode. This constant wall temperature is dictated by the ablation pressure requirements to drive compression, which lie on average at about 0.4 keV (out of a range of 0.2 to 2 keV), corresponding to several million kelvins. Wall temperature depended on the temperature of the primary's core which peaked at about 5.4 keV during boosted-fission. The final wall-temperature, which corresponds to energy of the wall-reradiated X-rays to the secondary's pusher, also drops due to losses from the hohlraum material itself. Natural uranium nails, lined to the top of their head with copper, attached the radiation case to the ballistic case. The nails were bolted in vertical arrays in a double-shear configuration to better distribute the shear loads. This method of attaching the radiation case to the ballistic case was first used successfully in the Ivy Mike device. The radiation case had a parabolic end, which housed the COBRA primary that was employed to create the conditions needed to start the fusion reaction, and its other end was a cylinder, as also seen in Bravo's declassified film.

The space between the uranium fusion tamper, and the case formed a radiation channel to conduct X-rays from the primary to the secondary assembly; the interstage. It is one of the most closely guarded secrets of a multistage thermonuclear weapon. Implosion of the secondary assembly is indirectly driven, and the techniques used in the interstage to smooth the spatial profile (i.e. reduce coherence and nonuniformities) of the primary's irradiance are of utmost importance. This was done with the introduction of the channel filler—an optical element used as a refractive medium, also encountered as random-phase plate in the ICF laser assemblies. This medium was a polystyrene plastic foam filling, extruded or impregnated with a low-molecular-weight hydrocarbon (possibly methane gas), which turned to a low-Z plasma from the X-rays, and along with channeling radiation it modulated the ablation front on the high-Z surfaces; it "tamped" the sputtering effect that would otherwise "choke" radiation from compressing the secondary. The reemitted X-rays from the radiation case must be deposited uniformly on the outer walls of the secondary's tamper and ablate it externally, driving the thermonuclear fuel capsule (increasing the density and temperature of the fusion fuel) to the point needed to sustain a thermonuclear reaction. (see Nuclear weapon design). This point is above the threshold where the fusion fuel would turn opaque to its emitting radiation, as determined from its Rosseland opacity, meaning that the generated energy balances the energy lost to fuel's vicinity (as radiation, particle losses). After all, for any hydrogen weapon system to work, this energy equilibrium must be maintained through the compression equilibrium between the fusion tamper and the spark plug (see below), hence their name equilibrium supers.

Since the ablative process takes place on both walls of the radiation channel, a numerical estimate made with ISRINEX (a thermonuclear explosion simulation program) suggested that the uranium tamper also had a thickness of 2.5 cm, so that an equal pressure would be applied to both walls of the hohlraum. The rocket effect on the surface of tamper's wall created by the ablation of its several superficial layers would force an equal mass of uranium that rested in the remainder of the tamper to speed inwards, thus imploding the thermonuclear core. At the same time, the rocket effect on the surface of the hohlraum would force the radiation case to speed outwards. The ballistic case would confine the exploding radiation case for as long as necessary. The fact that the tamper material was uranium enriched in U is primarily based on the final fission reaction fragments detected in the radiochemical analysis, which conclusively showed the presence of U, found by the Japanese in the shot debris. The first-generation thermonuclear weapons (MK-14, 16, 17, 21, 22 and 24) all used uranium tampers enriched to 37.5% U. The exception to this was the MK-15 ZOMBIE that used a 93.5% enriched fission jacket.

The secondary assembly

The secondary assembly was the actual SHRIMP component of the weapon. The weapon, like most contemporary thermonuclear weapons at that time, bore the same codename as the secondary component. The secondary was situated in the cylindrical end of the device, where its end was locked to the radiation case by a type of mortise and tenon joint. The hohlraum at its cylindrical end had an internal projection, which nested the secondary and had better structural strength to support the secondary's assembly, which had most of the device's mass. A visualization to this is that the joint looked much like a cap (the secondary) fitted in a cone (the projection of the radiation case). Any other major supporting structure would interfere to radiation transfer from the primary to the secondary and complex vibrational behavior. With this form of joint bearing most of the structural loads of the secondary, the latter and the hohlraum-ballistic case ensemble behaved as a single mass sharing common eigenmodes. To reduce excessive loading of the joint, especially during deployment of the weapon, the forward section of the secondary (i.e. the thermal blast/heat shield) was anchored to the radiation case by a set of thin wires, which also aligned the center line of the secondary with the primary, as they diminished bending and torsional loads on the secondary, another technique adopted from the SAUSAGE. The secondary assembly was an elongated truncated cone. From its front part (excluding the blast-heat shield) to its aft section it was steeply tapered. Tapering was used for two reasons. First, radiation drops by the square of the distance, hence radiation coupling is relatively poor in the aftermost sections of the secondary. This made the use of a higher mass of the then scarce fusion fuel in the rear end of the secondary assembly ineffective and the overall design wasteful. This was also the reason why the lower-enriched slugs of fusion fuel were placed far aft of the fuel capsule. Second, as the primary could not illuminate the whole surface of the hohlraum, in part due to the large axial length of the secondary, relatively small solid angles would be effective to compress the secondary, leading to poor radiation focusing. By tapering the secondary, the hohlraum could be shaped as a cylinder in its aft section obviating the need to machine the radiation case to a parabola at both ends. This optimized radiation focusing and enabled a streamlined production line, as it was cheaper, faster and easier to manufacture a radiation case with only one parabolic end. The tapering in this design was much steeper than its cousins, the RUNT, and the ALARM CLOCK devices. SHRIMP's tapering and its mounting to the hohlraum apparently made the whole secondary assembly resemble the body of a shrimp. The secondary's length is defined by the two pairs of dark-colored diagnostic hot spot pipes attached to the middle and left section of the device. They would carry the initial reaction's light up to the array of 12 mirror towers built in an arc on the artificial  shot island created for the event. From those pipes, mirrors would reflect early bomb light from the bomb casing to a series of remote high-speed cameras, and so that Los Alamos could determine both the simultaneity of the design (i.e. the time interval between primary's firing and secondary's ignition) and the thermonuclear burn rate in these two crucial areas of the secondary device.

This secondary assembly device contained the lithium deuteride fusion fuel in a stainless-steel canister. Running down to the center of the secondary was a 1.3 cm thick hollow cylindrical rod of plutonium, nested in the steel canister. This was the spark plug, a tritium-boosted fission device. It was assembled by plutonium rings and had a hollow volume inside that measured about 0.5 cm in diameter. This central volume was lined with copper, which like the liner in the primary's fissile core prevented DT gas diffusion in plutonium. The spark plug's boosting charge contained about 4 grams of tritium and, imploding together with the secondary's compression, was timed to detonate by the first generations of neutrons that arrived from the primary. Timing was defined by the geometric characteristics of the sparkplug (its uncompressed annular radius), which detonated when its criticality, or k, transcended 1. Its purpose was to compress the fusion material around it from its inside, equally applying pressure with the tamper. The compression factor of the fusion fuel and its adiabatic compression energy determined the minimal energy required for the spark plug to counteract the compression of the fusion fuel and the tamper's momentum. The spark plug weighed about 18 kg, and its initial firing yielded . The energy required by the spark plug to counteract the compression of the fusion fuel was lower than the primary's yield because coupling of the primary's energy in the hohlraum is accompanied by losses due to the difference between the X-ray fireball and the hohlraum temperatures. The neutrons entered the assembly by a small hole through the ≈28 cm thick U blast-heat shield. It was positioned in front of the secondary assembly facing the primary. Similar to the tamper-fusion capsule assembly, the shield was shaped as a circular frustum, with its small diameter facing the primary's side, and with its large diameter locked by a type of mortise and tenon joint to the rest of the secondary assembly. The shield-tamper ensemble can be visualized as a circular bifrustum. All parts of the tamper were similarly locked together to provide structural support and rigidity to the secondary assembly. Surrounding the fusion-fuel–spark-plug assembly was the uranium tamper with a standoff air-gap about 0.9 cm wide that was to increase the tamper's momentum, a levitation technique used as early as Operation Sandstone and described by physicist Ted Taylor as hammer-on-the-nail-impact. Since there were also technical concerns that high-Z tamper material would mix rapidly with the relatively low-density fusion fuel—leading to unacceptably large radiation losses—the stand-off gap also acted as a buffer to mitigate the unavoidable and undesirable Taylor mixing.

Use of boron
Boron was used at many locations in this dry system; it has a high cross-section for the absorption of slow neutrons, which fission U and Pu, but a low cross-section for the absorption of fast neutrons, which fission U. Because of this characteristic, B deposited onto the surface of the secondary stage would prevent pre-detonation of the spark plug by stray neutrons from the primary without interfering with the subsequent fissioning of the U of the fusion tamper wrapping the secondary. Boron also played a role in increasing the compressive plasma pressure around the secondary by blocking the sputtering effect, leading to higher thermonuclear efficiency. Because the structural foam holding the secondary in place within the casing was doped with B, the secondary was compressed more highly, at a cost of some radiated neutrons. (The Castle Koon MORGENSTERN device did not use B in its design; as a result, the intense neutron flux from its RACER IV primary predetonated the spherical fission spark plug, which in turn "cooked" the fusion fuel, leading to an overall poor compression.) The plastic's low molecular weight is unable to implode the secondary's mass. Its plasma-pressure is confined in the boiled-off sections of the tamper and the radiation case so that material from neither of these two walls can enter the radiation channel that has to be open for the radiation transit.

Detonation

The device was mounted in a "shot cab" on an artificial island built on a reef off Namu Island, in Bikini Atoll. A sizable array of diagnostic instruments were trained on it, including high-speed cameras trained through an arc of mirror towers around the shot cab.

The detonation took place at 06:45 on March 1, 1954, local time (18:45 on February 28 GMT).

In terms of energy released (usually measured in TNT equivalence), Castle Bravo was about 1,000 times more powerful than each of the atomic bombs that were dropped on Hiroshima and Nagasaki during World War II. Castle Bravo is the sixth largest nuclear explosion in history, exceeded by the Soviet tests of Tsar Bomba at approximately 50 Mt, Test 219 at 24.2 Mt, and three other (Test 147, Test 173 and Test 174) ≈20 Mt Soviet tests in 1962 at Novaya Zemlya.

High yield

The yield of 15 megatons was triple that of the 5 Mt predicted by its designers. The cause of the higher yield was an error made by designers of the device at Los Alamos National Laboratory. They considered only the lithium-6 isotope in the lithium-deuteride secondary to be reactive; the lithium-7 isotope, accounting for 60% of the lithium content, was assumed to be inert. It was expected that the lithium-6 isotope would absorb a neutron from the fissioning plutonium and emit an alpha particle and tritium in the process, of which the latter would then fuse with the deuterium and increase the yield in a predicted manner. Lithium-6 indeed reacted in this manner.

It was assumed that the lithium-7 would absorb one neutron, producing lithium-8, which decays (through beta decay into beryllium-8) to a pair of alpha particles on a timescale of nearly a second, vastly longer than the timescale of nuclear detonation. However, when lithium-7 is bombarded with energetic neutrons with an energy greater than 2.47 MeV, rather than simply absorbing a neutron, it undergoes nuclear fission into an alpha particle, a tritium nucleus, and another neutron. As a result, much more tritium was produced than expected, the extra tritium fusing with deuterium and producing an extra neutron. The extra neutron produced by fusion and the extra neutron released directly by lithium-7 decay produced a much larger neutron flux. The result was greatly increased fissioning of the uranium tamper and increased yield.

Summarizing, the reactions involving lithium-6 result in some combination of the two following net reactions:
n + Li → H + He + 4.783 MeV
Li + H → 2 He + 22.373 MeV
But when lithium-7 is present, one also has some amounts of the following two net reactions:
Li + n → H + He + n
Li + H → 2 He + n + 15.123 MeV

This resultant extra fuel (both lithium-6 and lithium-7) contributed greatly to the fusion reactions and neutron production and in this manner greatly increased the device's explosive output. The test used lithium with a high percentage of lithium-7 only because lithium-6 was then scarce and expensive; the later Castle Union test used almost pure lithium-6. Had sufficient lithium-6 been available, the usability of the common lithium-7 might not have been discovered.

The unexpectedly high yield of the device severely damaged many of the permanent buildings on the control site island on the far side of the atoll. Little of the desired diagnostic data on the shot was collected; many instruments designed to transmit their data back before being destroyed by the blast were instead vaporized instantly, while most of the instruments that were expected to be recovered for data retrieval were destroyed by the blast.

High levels of fallout

The fission reactions of the natural uranium tamper were quite dirty, producing a large amount of fallout. That, combined with the larger than expected yield and a major wind shift, produced some very serious consequences for those in the fallout range. In the declassified film Operation Castle, the task force commander Major General Percy Clarkson pointed to a diagram indicating that the wind shift was still in the range of "acceptable fallout", although just barely.

The decision to carry out the Bravo test under the prevailing winds was made by Dr. Alvin C. Graves, the Scientific Director of Operation Castle. Graves had total authority over detonating the weapon, above that of the military commander of Operation Castle. Graves appears in the widely available film of the earlier 1952 test "Ivy Mike", which examines the last-minute fallout decisions. The narrator, the western actor Reed Hadley, is filmed aboard the control ship in that film, showing the final conference. Hadley points out that 20,000 people live in the potential area of the fallout. He asks the control panel scientist if the test can be aborted and is told "yes", but it would ruin all their preparations in setting up timed measuring instruments. In Mike, the fallout correctly landed north of the inhabited area but, in the 1954 Bravo test, there was a large amount of wind shear, and the wind that was blowing north the day before the test steadily veered towards the east.

Inhabited islands affected 

Radioactive fallout was spread eastward onto the inhabited Rongelap and Rongerik atolls, which were evacuated 48 hours after the detonation. In 1957, the Atomic Energy Commission deemed Rongelap safe to return, and allowed 82 inhabitants to move back to the island. Upon their return, they discovered that their previous staple foods, including arrowroot, makmok, and fish, had either disappeared or gave residents various illnesses, and they were again removed. Ultimately, 15 islands and atolls were contaminated, and by 1963 Marshall Islands natives began to suffer from thyroid tumors, including 20 of 29 Rongelap children at the time of Bravo, and many birth defects were reported. The islanders received compensation from the U.S. government, relative to how much contamination they received, beginning in 1956; by 1995 the Nuclear Claims Tribunal reported that it had awarded $43.2 million, nearly its entire fund, to 1,196 claimants for 1,311 illnesses. A medical study, named Project 4.1, studied the effects of the fallout on the islanders.

Although the atmospheric fallout plume drifted eastward, once fallout landed in the water it was carried in several directions by ocean currents, including northwest and southwest.

Daigo Fukuryū Maru

A Japanese fishing boat, Daigo Fukuryū Maru (Lucky Dragon No.5), came in direct contact with the fallout, which caused many of the crew to grow ill due to radiation sickness. One member died of a secondary infection six months later after acute radiation exposure, and another had a child that was stillborn and deformed. This resulted in an international incident and reignited Japanese concerns about radiation, especially as Japanese citizens were once more adversely affected by US nuclear weapons. The official US position had been that the growth in the strength of atomic bombs was not accompanied by an equivalent growth in radioactivity released, and they denied that the crew was affected by radioactive fallout. Japanese scientists who had collected data from the fishing vessel disagreed with this.

Sir Joseph Rotblat, working at St Bartholomew's Hospital, London, demonstrated that the contamination caused by the fallout from the test was far greater than that stated officially. Rotblat deduced that the bomb had three stages and showed that the fission phase at the end of the explosion increased the amount of radioactivity a thousand-fold. Rotblat's paper was taken up by the media, and the outcry in Japan reached such a level that diplomatic relations became strained and the incident was even dubbed by some as a "second Hiroshima". Nevertheless, the Japanese and US governments quickly reached a political settlement, with the transfer to Japan of $15.3 million as compensation, with the surviving victims receiving about  million each ($5,550 in 1954, or about $ in ). It was also agreed that the victims would not be given Hibakusha status.

Bomb test personnel take shelter 

Unanticipated fallout and the radiation emitted by it also affected many of the vessels and personnel involved in the test, in some cases forcing them into bunkers for several hours. In contrast to the crew of the Lucky Dragon No. 5, who did not anticipate the hazard and therefore did not take shelter in the hold of their ship, or refrain from inhaling the fallout dust, the firing crew that triggered the explosion safely sheltered in their firing station when they noticed the wind was carrying the fallout in the unanticipated direction towards the island of Enyu on the Bikini Atoll where they were located, with the fire crew sheltering in place ("buttoning up") for several hours until outside radiation decayed to safer levels. "25 roentgens per hour" was recorded above the bunker.

US Navy ships affected 

The US Navy tanker  was at Enewetak Atoll in late February 1954. Patapsco lacked a decontamination washdown system, and was therefore ordered on 27 February, to return to Pearl Harbor at the highest possible speed. A breakdown in her engine systems, namely a cracked cylinder liner, slowed Patapsco to one-third of her full speed, and when the Castle Bravo detonation took place, she was still about 180 to 195 nautical miles east of Bikini. Patapsco was in the range of nuclear fallout, which began landing on the ship in the mid-afternoon of 2 March. By this time Patapsco was 565 to 586 nautical miles from ground zero. The fallout was at first thought to be harmless and there were no radiation detectors aboard, so no decontamination measures were taken. Measurements taken after Patapsco had returned to Pearl Harbor suggested an exposure range of 0.18 to 0.62 R/hr. Total exposure estimates range from 3.3 R to 18 R of whole-body radiation, taking into account the effects of natural washdown from rain, and variations between above- and below-deck exposure.

International incident 

The fallout spread traces of radioactive material as far as Australia, India and Japan, and even the United States and parts of Europe. Though organized as a secret test, Castle Bravo quickly became an international incident, prompting calls for a ban on the atmospheric testing of thermonuclear devices.

A worldwide network of gummed film stations was established to monitor fallout following Operation Castle. Although meteorological data was poor, a general connection of tropospheric flow patterns with observed fallout was evident. There was a tendency for fallout/debris to remain in tropical latitudes, with incursions into the temperate regions associated with meteorological disturbances of the predominantly zonal flow. Outside of the tropics, the Southwestern United States received the greatest total fallout, about five times that received in Japan.

Stratospheric fallout particles of strontium-90 from the test were later captured with balloon-borne air filters used to sample the air at stratospheric altitudes, the research (Project Ashcan) was conducted to better understand the stratosphere and fallout times, and arrive at more accurate meteorological models after hindcasting.

The fallout from Castle Bravo and other testing on the atoll also affected islanders who had previously inhabited the atoll, and who returned there some time after the tests. This was due to the presence of radioactive caesium-137 in locally grown coconut milk. Plants and trees absorb potassium as part of the normal biological process, but will also readily absorb caesium if present, being of the same group on the periodic table, and therefore very similar chemically. Islanders consuming contaminated coconut milk were found to have abnormally high concentrations of caesium in their bodies and so had to be evacuated from the atoll a second time.

The American magazine Consumer Reports warned of the contamination of milk with strontium-90.

Weapon history

The Soviet Union had previously used lithium deuteride in its Sloika design (known as the "Joe-4" in the U.S.), in 1953. It was not a true hydrogen bomb; fusion provided only 15–20% of its yield, most coming from boosted fission reactions. Its yield was 400 kilotons, and it could not be infinitely scaled, as with a true thermonuclear device.

The Teller–Ulam-based "Ivy Mike" device had a much greater yield of 10.4 Mt, but most of this also came from fission: 77% of the total came from fast fission of its natural-uranium tamper.

Castle Bravo had the greatest yield of any U.S. nuclear test, 15 Mt, though again, a substantial fraction came from fission. In the Teller–Ulam design, the fission and fusion stages were kept physically separate in a reflective cavity. The radiation from the exploding fission primary brought the fuel in the fusion secondary to critical density and pressure, setting off thermonuclear (fusion) chain reactions, which in turn set off a tertiary fissioning of the bomb's U fusion tamper and casing. Consequently, this type of bomb is also known as a "fission-fusion-fission" device. The Soviet researchers, led by Andrei Sakharov, developed and tested their first Teller–Ulam device in 1955.

The publication of the Bravo fallout analysis was a militarily sensitive issue, with Joseph Rotblat possibly deducing the staging nature of the Castle Bravo device by studying the ratio and presence of tell-tale isotopes, namely uranium-237, present in the fallout. This information could potentially reveal the means by which megaton-yield nuclear devices achieve their yield. Soviet scientist Andrei Sakharov hit upon what the Soviet Union regarded as "Sakharov's third idea" during the month after the Castle Bravo test, the final piece of the puzzle being the idea that the compression of the secondary can be accomplished by the primary's X-rays before fusion began.

This 18-megaton bomb was produced until July 1956. In 1957, it was converted into the Mark 36 nuclear bomb and entered into production again.

Health impacts 

Following the test, the United States Department of Energy estimated that 253 inhabitants of the Marshall Islands were impacted by the radioactive fallout. This single test exposed the surrounding populations to varying levels of radiation. The fallout levels attributed to the Castle Bravo test are the highest in history. Populations neighboring the test site were exposed to high levels of radiation resulting in mild radiation sickness of many (nausea, vomiting, diarrhea). Several weeks later, many people began suffering from alopecia (hair loss) and skin lesions as well.

The exposure to fallout has been linked to increase the likelihood of several types of cancer such as leukemia and thyroid cancer. The relationship between Iodine-131 levels and thyroid cancer is still being researched. There are also correlations between fallout exposure levels and diseases such as thyroid disease like hypothyroidism. Populations of the Marshall Islands that received significant exposure to radionuclides have a much greater risk of developing cancer.

The female population of the Marshall Islands have a sixty times greater mortality rate from cervical cancer than a comparable mainland United States population. The Islands populations also have a five time greater likelihood of breast or gastrointestinal mortality, and lung cancer mortality is three times higher than the mainland population. The mortality rate of the male population on the Marshall Islands from lung cancer is four times greater than the overall United States rates, and the oral cancer rates are ten times greater.

There is a presumed association between radiation levels and functioning of the female reproductive system.

In popular culture

The Castle Bravo detonation and the subsequent poisoning of the crew aboard Daigo Fukuryū Maru led to an increase in antinuclear protests in Japan. It was compared to the bombings of Hiroshima and Nagasaki, and the Castle Bravo test was frequently part of the plots of numerous Japanese media, especially in relation to Japan's most widely recognized media icon, Godzilla. In the 2019 film Godzilla: King of the Monsters, Castle Bravo becomes the call sign for Monarch Outpost 54 located in the Atlantic Ocean, near Bermuda.

The Donald Fagen song "Memorabilia" from his 2012 album Sunken Condos mentions both the Castle Bravo and Ivy King nuclear tests.

In 2013, the Defense Threat Reduction Agency published Castle Bravo: Fifty Years of Legend and Lore. The report is a guide to off-site radiation exposures, a narrative history, and a guide to primary historical references concerning the Castle Bravo test.  The report focuses on the circumstances that resulted in radioactive exposure of the uninhabited atolls, and makes no attempt to address in detail the effects on or around Bikini Atoll.

Gallery

See also

 History of nuclear weapons
 Operation Ivy
 Tsar Bomba
 Chagai-I
 Chagai-II

References
Notes

Citations

Bibliography

 Chuck Hansen, U. S. Nuclear Weapons: The Secret History (Arlington: AeroFax, 1988)
 Holly M. Barker, Bravo for the Marshallese: Regaining control in a Post-Nuclear, Post Colonial World (Belmont, CA: Wadsworth, 2004)
 Republic of the Marshall Islands Embassy website

External links

 
 
 
 US tests hydrogen bomb in Bikini (BBC News)
 First-person article about conducting the test
 Strategic Air Command History-Development of Atomic Weapons 1956

Nuclear testing at Bikini Atoll
Nuclear accidents and incidents
Ralik Chain
Explosions in 1954
March 1954 events in Oceania
1950s in the Marshall Islands
1954 disasters in Oceania
1954 in military history
1954 in the environment
1954 in the Trust Territory of the Pacific Islands